Cartesian Dreams is the seventh studio album by the rock band House of Lords. It was released on September 18, 2009 in Europe and October 13, 2009 in the US.

The album features the same line-up as the previous albums World Upside Down and Come to My Kingdom, except new bassist Matt McKenna, and was produced by singer James Christian and Jeff Kent with Tommy Denander as co producer on a couple of songs he co wrote.

Track listing 
 "Cartesian Dreams" - 5:15
 "Born to Be Your Baby" - 4:31
 "Desert Rain" - 5:08
 "Sweet September" (Christian/Denander/Reed/Baker) - 3:45
 "Bangin'" - 3:32
 "A Simple Plan" - 4:25
 "Never Never Look Back" (Christian/Denander/Baker)- 4:06
 "The Bigger They Come" - 3:53
 "Repo Man" - 4:11
 "Saved By Rock" - 4:45
 "Joanna"  - 3:30
 "The Train" (European Bonus track) / "Who" (Japanese bonus track)- 4:41

Personnel 
 James Christian - lead vocals, keyboards
 Jimi Bell - guitar
 Matt McKenna - bass, backing vocals
 B.J. Zampa - drums, percussion

Additional musicians
 Tommy Denander - guitar, keyboards, co-production, songwriting

Release history

References 

2009 albums
House of Lords (band) albums
Frontiers Records albums